Douglas Starnley Ferreira (born 11 February 1993), commonly known as Douglas Mineiro, is a Brazilian footballer who currently plays as a forward.

Career statistics

Club

Notes

Honour
Nongbua Pitchaya
 Thai League 2 Champions : 2020–21

References

1993 births
Living people
Brazilian footballers
Brazilian expatriate footballers
Association football forwards
Uruguayan Primera División players
Moldovan Super Liga players
Danish 1st Division players
Danish 2nd Division players
Danish Superliga players
Atenas de San Carlos players
Sociedade Esportiva Recreativa e Cultural Brasil players
Esporte Clube Pelotas players
FC Zimbru Chișinău players
FC Helsingør players
Brazilian expatriate sportspeople in Uruguay
Brazilian expatriate sportspeople in Moldova
Brazilian expatriate sportspeople in Denmark
Expatriate footballers in Uruguay
Expatriate footballers in Moldova
Expatriate men's footballers in Denmark